The Guardia Urbana de Buenos Aires (Buenos Aires Urban Guard) was a specialized civilian force of the city of Buenos Aires, Argentina, that used to deal with different urban conflicts with the objective of develop actions of prevention, dissuasion and mediation, promoting effective behaviors that guarantee the security and the integrity of public order and social coexistence. The unit continuously assisted the personnel of the Argentine Federal Police, especially in emergency situations, events of massive concurrence, and protection of tourist establishments.

The group permanently did controls of seat belt use, blood alcohol content tests, and traffic order; also its agents are enabled to offer quick and objective information to tourists and foreign people. Other functions include take part when a public case of intentional damage or negligence happen; anyway, its personnel always must act in a preventive, educative, dissuasive and coordinated form.

The Urban Guard officials did not carry any weapon in the performing of their duties. Their basic tools are an HT radio transmissor and a whistle.

As of March, 2008, the Guardia Urbana was removed. Its people were "recycled" into a new law enforcement organization, about traffic order called the Seguridad Vial.

Ranks
Ranks of the Urban Guard were novel and had a maritime theme, reflecting Buenos Aires' status as a major port.

The ranks (in Spanish followed by English) were:
 Brigadier Comisionado en Jefe, "Commissioned Brigadier-in-Chief" (only used on one occasion)
 Comodoro General, "Commodore General"
 Comodoro, "Commodore"
 Vice-comodoro, "Vice-Commodore"
 Edecán Mayor, "Aide-de-camp Major"
 Edecán, "Aide-de-camp"
 Inspector Porteño, "Porteño Inspector"
 Grumete Furriel, "Quartermaster Shipmate"
 Grumete-Tropa, "Troop Shpimate"
 Aprendiz de los Buenos Aires, "Buenos Aires Apprentice"

See also
Argentine Federal Police
Buenos Aires Police
Santa Fe Province Police
Interior Security System

External links
 Official website

Defunct law enforcement agencies of Argentina